Simon Hewitt Cook (born 29 January 1972) is an Australian former cricketer.

After graduating from the Australian Cricket Academy, he debuted for Victoria early in 1993. He showed promise in the 1993–94 season, taking 30 wickets at 29.5.

He moved to New South Wales in the 1995–96 season. He was a surprise selection in two Test matches against New Zealand late in 1997, despite being considered by some to be not even up to first-class standard. On his debut, he took five wickets in the second innings against New Zealand in Perth.

Soon after his two Tests, which yielded a respectable bowling average of 20 as a replacement for Glenn McGrath, Cook disappeared off the scene fairly quickly due to injuries. He did play four more Sheffield Shield games in that 1997–98 season, including two four-wicket hauls, but in 1998–99 played just two games for just one wicket. He missed the entire 1999–2000 first-class season, and his next match in December 2000 turned out to be his last in the Pura Cup/Sheffield Shield.

Cook retired from all forms of cricket at the end of the 2003–04 season, playing with Victorian Premier Cricket's Melbourne Cricket Club.

References

External links

1972 births
Living people
Australia Test cricketers
New South Wales cricketers
Victoria cricketers
Melbourne Cricket Club cricketers
Worcestershire Cricket Board cricketers
Cricketers who have taken five wickets on Test debut
Australian cricketers
Cricketers from Victoria (Australia)